The 2004 FIVB Women's World Olympic Qualification Tournament was a women's volleyball tournament to determine which four teams would compete in the women's event at the 2004 Athens Olympics. It was held on 8–16 May 2004 in Tokyo, Japan.

Round robin
 Saturday May 8, 2004

 Sunday May 9, 2004

 Tuesday May 11, 2004

 Wednesday May 12, 2004

 Friday May 14, 2004

 Saturday May 15, 2004

 Sunday May 16, 2004

Final ranking

 South Korea is counted as The Asian Continental Qualification Tournament Champion since it is the best Asian team except the winner.

Awards

Best Scorer:

Best Spiker:

Best Blocker:

Best Server:

Best Receiver:

Best Setter:

Best Digger:

References
 FIVB Results

Volleyball
Olympic Qualification
Volleyball
Volleyball,Olympic Qualification
Qualification
Olympic Qualification
2004 Women's Olympic